KYTC (102.7 FM, "Super Hits 102.7") is a radio station that broadcasts a classic hits music format. Licensed to Northwood, Iowa, U.S., it serves northern Iowa and southern Minnesota. The station is currently owned by Alpha Media, through licensee Digity 3E License, LLC. The station was originally operated by Northwood businessman, Marlin Hanson as an oldies radio station with an effective radiated power of 3,000 watts, then 6,000 watts. Hanson built the station because he bought the tower from the local cable company after they abandoned it and decided a radio station would be a good use for the empty tower. It was sold to Dave Nolander who also owned KATE radio in Albert Lea, MN. It was operated as an oldies station featuring music of the 1950s and 1960s from a studio located in Northwood and satellite programming during the evening hours. The station was sold to Three Eagles Communications and the power increased to 25,000 watts. Between 2002 and 2012. the station changed from Oldies to Country to active rock and finally back to a hits of the 1960s through the 1980s. The station transmitter is located 3 miles north of Northwood and the studio is located in Mason City. Current owner Digity, LLC purchased the station on September 12, 2014.

History
On February 4, 2012, KYTC changed format from active rock (branded as "The Blaze") to classic hits, branded as "Super Hits 102.7".

External links

YTC
Classic hits radio stations in the United States
Worth County, Iowa
Radio stations established in 1988